Maciej Łubieński (1572 in Łubna – 1652 in Łowicz), of Pomian coat of arms, was a primate of Poland, archbishop of Gniezno, bishop of Poznań, bishop of Kujawy and interrex in the Polish–Lithuanian Commonwealth.

He was educated in Sieradz, Kalisz, Poznań and Kraków. In 1641 he became the archbishop of Gniezno and primate of Poland. During the Chmielnicki Uprising in 1648, after the death of Polish king Władysław IV Waza he became the interrex and in 1649 he crowned Jan II Kazimierz as the king of Poland. He died in Łowicz in 1652, and he was buried in his family crypt in Łowicz.

References 
 Urban W., Łubieński Maciej h. Pomian (1572–1652), [w:] "Wielkopolski słownik biograficzny" 1983, s. 437.

External links
Virtual tour Gniezno Cathedral 
List of Primates of Poland 

Bishops of Kujawy and Włocławek
Bishops of Poznań
16th-century Polish nobility
Archbishops of Gniezno
Polish interreges
17th-century Roman Catholic archbishops in the Polish–Lithuanian Commonwealth
Burials at Gniezno Cathedral
1572 births
1652 deaths
People from Sieradz County
17th-century Polish nobility